Otto Thorbeck (26 August 1912 in Brieg, Silesia – 10 October 1976 in Nuremberg) was a German lawyer and Nazi SS judge in the Hauptamt SS-Gericht.

In 1941, Sturmbannführer (Major) Thorbeck was appointed the chief judge of the SS and police court in Munich for which SS Standartenführer (Colonel) Walter Huppenkothen was the prosecutor. On 8 April 1945, under orders from Ernst Kaltenbrunner he presided over a drumhead court-martial without witnesses, records of proceedings or a defence in Flossenbürg concentration camp, that condemned Lutheran pastor Dietrich Bonhoeffer, General Hans Oster, Army chief judge Karl Sack, Captain Ludwig Gehre, and Admiral Wilhelm Canaris to death. They were all hanged on 9 April, two weeks before the United States Army liberated the camp.

After the war Thorbeck worked as an attorney in Nuremberg. In 1955, he was convicted by a court of assizes in Augsburg for assisting in murder and sentenced to four years' imprisonment. On 19 June 1956, the Federal Court of Justice of Germany exonerated him on grounds that the killings were legal because the Nazi regime had the right to execute traitors. The decision was rescinded by the Berlin State Court in 1996.

References

1912 births
1976 deaths
People from Brzeg
SS-Sturmbannführer
People from the Province of Silesia
Judges in the Nazi Party
Lawyers in the Nazi Party